George of the Jungle is an animated television series. It is a reboot of Jay Ward and Bill Scott’s 1967 American animated television series of the same name, which in turn is a spoof of the fictional character Tarzan, created by Edgar Rice Burroughs. Using Flash animation, it is produced in Canada, airing there on Teletoon. The remake mostly stays true to the original production, with a few key differences existing between the two. One episode of the show typically consists of two 11-minute segments. This is unlike the original cartoon, which featured other stories such as Tom Slick and Super Chicken.

The original series aired from June 29, 2007 until January 11, 2008. The original series premiered on Teletoon on January 11, 2008 and on Cartoon Network in the United States exactly a year prior.

The series returned 8 years after the original first season with a second season on September 10, 2016. The revival season concluded on February 18, 2017.

Characters

Main
 George – A friendly, yet dim-witted, strong man in a loincloth, he lives in a jungle in Africa. Possessing incredible strength, bravery and a penchant for repeatedly crashing into trees while vine-swinging, George acts as the protector of all the jungle's inhabitants. He also acts immature and refers to himself in the third person. In season 2, he now has muscles and a deeper voice to better resemble his design in the original series.
 Ape – A sarcastic and intelligent gorilla that lives with George in the jungle. He functions as George's surrogate brother, parental figure and best friend, although his attempts to educate George have a long history of repeated failures. He also tends to serve as the voice of reason most of the time. In "George's Birthday Present", it is revealed Ape is 5 years old in ape years. Every time he hears the sound of Mitch's bongos, he dances uncontrollably, which results in mass insanity and the destruction of their tree house. He also dances on his fingers when George uses a leaf as a kazoo as revealed in "Ape Goes Ape". In season 2, his character remains mostly the same, the only notable difference being that he has a British accent as he does in the original series.
 Ursula – A tomboyish city girl who came to live in the jungle with George and his friends along with her father Dr. Scott. She quickly forms a bond with Magnolia, the latter having saved her from drowning with mouth to mouth resuscitation and Ursula returning the favor with CPR and a defibrillator, causing the two to be frequently seen together. Young, reckless and eager to introduce modern culture into the jungle, she often tries to educate her new friends to the marvels of modern city life (such as Christmas or traffic systems), only to usually have her attempts backfire. Regardless, she does her best to assist her friends when necessary. She is still adjusting to jungle life, and so she still has much to learn. In season 2, her name is Magnolia and she studies and ventures the jungle without her father. She dreams of winning the Nobel Prize when her research is complete.
 Magnolia – A native of the jungle and valley girl figure, she is one of George's closest friends since she came to the jungle. Despite her dressing in jungle attire (such as loincloths and sticks) as well as fits of hyperactivity, she originally appeared to be very well educated in both human and jungle knowledge, often helping to bridge the gap between Ursula's city life and jungle life. She speaks with a Southern accent, and can appear somewhat dimwitted at times. She is the daughter of the Witch Doctor, and therefore a Witch Doctor in training (according to the episode, "Frankengeorge"). In season 2, her name is now Ursula and she behaves and speaks like a primitive cavewoman, wreaking mayhem throughout the jungle for her own amusement.

Supporting
 Narrator – The narrator of each George of the Jungle episode. In comparison to the narrator of the original cartoon, he speaks in a documentary-style fashion, often beginning each episode claiming "To survive in the jungle…", often followed by a situation in complete contrast to the first impression of his introduction. In season 2, he chimes in much more frequently, and also breaks the fourth wall by being able to speak directly to other characters (who refer to him as "Sky Voice").
 Dr. Scott – The modern doctor now living in the jungle with his daughter. He has formed a somewhat friendly (and often hostile) rivalry with the local Witch Doctor, continuously trying to disprove his barbaric medicine and shaman skills with modern science (often with equally unsuccessful results). In season 2, his name is Dr. Chicago, and he is now an evil dentist and no longer Magnolia's father. His schemes mostly involve conquest of the jungle, but said plots are always foiled by George.
 Witch Doctor – A very compact, diminutive character who believes his shaman skills are the solution to all problems. He often competes with Dr. Scott and his modern medicine to see who can solve a problem first, although neither usually provides the solution to whatever problem they tackle. Unlike most others, his character remains almost completely intact in the transition to season 2, with the only notable differences being that his voice is much deeper and he is no longer Ursula's father.
 Big Mitch – A conniving golden marmoset and frequent pest to the jungle community. He lives in an ancient temple full of riches and booby traps, and has a pair of bongos with him.
 Shep –  George's pet elephant who acts like a dog. He is very untrained, and can often be seen destroying sections of the jungle.
 Tookie-Tookie Bird – George's second pet, a parrot-like bird that can only say his own name.
 Howie - A howler monkey who runs a juice bar.

Others
 Carl –  Carl is a baboon who constantly makes a fool out of George and Ape.
 Cousin Larry – George's arrogant human cousin, who does his best to win at everything, no matter the cost. He was eventually revealed to be a cheater in all his victories and was ousted from the jungle.
 Cousin Papaya – George and Ape's cousin, a King Kong-like gorilla that made a promise to beat the living daylights out of anyone who would mess with George or Ape and the other gorillas.
 Edward Madmun – The creator of Madmun Island. He has an associate (and later enemy) who helped him climb to the top of Mount Everest and swim Madmun across the English Channel. George, Ape and the others often accidentally say "Madman" for his name, but someone always reminds them "It's MadMUN!".
Lion – A lion who was defeated by George in his childhood.
Tiger – A hungry predator who likes to feast on small defenseless creatures and appears randomly in cameos (as seen in "Rainy Season" and "Eagle Tick").

Voice cast
 Lee Tockar (season 1) and Cory Doran (season 2) as George, Tookie-Tookie Bird
 Paul Dobson (season 1) and Rob Tinkler (season 2) as the voice of an ape named Ape
 Britt Irvin (season 1) and Linda Ballantyne (season 2) as Ursula/Magnolia
 Tabitha St. Germain (season 1) and Bridget Wareham  (season 2) as Magnolia/Ursula
 Mark Oliver (season 1) and Terry McGurrin (season 2) as Dr. Towel Scott/Dr. Chicago
 Brian Drummond (season 1) and Martin Julien (season 2) as Witch Doctor
 Tabitha St. Germain (season 1) and Cory Doran (season 2) as Tookie-Tookie Bird
 Doron Bell as Big Mitch
 Bill Mondy as Mantler
 Peter Kelamis as Cousin Larry
 Trevor Devall as Jungle Joel
 Michael Daingerfield (season 1) and Jeff Lumby (season 2) as Narrator

Pilot voices (2005) 

 Billy West
 Wally Wingert
 Dee Bradley Baker
 Stephen Root
 Rodger Bumpass
 Lauren Tom

Episodes

Home media

References

External links
 

George of the Jungle
Animated television series reboots
2000s American animated television series
2007 American television series debuts
2008 American television series endings
2010s American animated television series
2016 American television series debuts
2017 American television series endings
American television series revived after cancellation
American children's animated comedy television series
American flash animated television series
2000s Canadian animated television series
2007 Canadian television series debuts
2008 Canadian television series endings
2010s Canadian animated television series
2016 Canadian television series debuts
2017 Canadian television series endings
Canadian television series revived after cancellation
Canadian children's animated comedy television series
Canadian flash animated television series
Fictional illeists
Television series by DHX Media
Teletoon original programming
Cartoon Network original programming
Animated television series about apes
Animated television series about elephants
Television shows set in Africa
English-language television shows